The 1991–92 SK Rapid Wien season was the 94th season in club history.

Squad statistics

Fixtures and results

Bundesliga

Cup

References

1991-92 Rapid Wien Season
Rapid